Snooker at the 1964 Summer Paralympics consisted of a men's event. It was held at the National Gymnasium, Tokyo from 9 to 12 November 1964.

The official Paralympics website states that there were four competitors, from three different countries: two from Malta, and one each from Great Britain and the United States. Ian Brittain's history of the Paralympic Games mentions a further competitor, Hugh Stewart, as a member of the Great Britain team for both snooker and table tennis.

Michael Shelton won the gold medal. Following this, he was filmed for Mining Review 18th Year No.5 (1965).

Medal summary

References

External links
Footage of the 1964 games. Snooker is included at around 18 minutes and 30 seconds in.

1964 Summer Paralympics events
1964
Paralympics